Mark H. Erickson was the thirteenth president of Wittenberg University from 2005 to 2012.

He graduated from Princeton University, Harvard Graduate School of Education, and Lehigh University.

References

Heads of universities and colleges in the United States
Living people
Harvard Graduate School of Education alumni
Princeton University alumni
Lehigh University alumni
Year of birth missing (living people)